Eurithe K. LaBarthe was an American teacher and principal who served as a state legislator in Utah. She was a Democrat who lived in Salt Lake City. She wrote the high hat law which required women to remove their hats at public venues, so views would not be obstructed, or face a fine. She proposed a curfew for children. She was an organizer of the Utah State Historical Society.

She was born in Illinois in 1845. She was not Mormon. She was elected in 1896.

References

Women state legislators in Utah
Politicians from Salt Lake City
1845 births
Year of death missing
19th-century American politicians
19th-century American women educators
19th-century American women politicians
Women school principals and headteachers
Schoolteachers from Utah
American school principals
19th-century American educators
Democratic Party members of the Utah House of Representatives
People from Illinois